The Akananuru (literally "four hundred [poems] in the akam genre"), sometimes called Nedunthokai (lit. "anthology of long poems"), is a classical Tamil poetic work and one of the Eight Anthologies (Ettuthokai) in the Sangam literature. It is a collection of 400 love poems with invocatory poem dedicated to Shiva. The collected poems were composed by 144 poets, except 3 poems which are by anonymous author(s). The poems range between 13 and 31 lines, and are long enough to include more details of the subject, episode and its context. According to Kamil Zvelebil – a Tamil literature and history scholar, they are "one of the most valuable collections" from ancient Tamil history perspective.

The Akananuru anthology is notable for its mathematical arrangement: the odd number poems are dedicated to palai (arid landscape); poem number ten and its multiples (10, 20, 30, etc., up to 400) are neytal (coastal landscape); poems bearing number 2 and then in increments of 6 followed by 4 (that is number 8, 12, 18, 22, 28, etc.) belong to the kuṟiñci (mountainous landscape); poems bearing number 4 and then in increments of 10 (14, 24, 34, 44, etc.) are mullai (pastoral forests); poems with number 6 and then in increments of 10 (16, 26, 36, etc.) are marutam (riverine farmlands). The anthology was compiled by Uruttiracanman, the son of Maturai Uppurikuti Kilan under the patronage of the Pandyan king Ukkiraperuvaluti.

The Akananuru poems offer many valuable cultural insights as well as historically significant evidence and allusions. For example, poem 69, 281 and 375 mention the Maurya Empire, poems 251 and 265 allude to the Nandas, the poem 148 mentions Greek-Romans (Yavanas) as trading gold for pepper through Muziris – an ancient Kerala port near Kochi, and a number of poems echo the Hindu puranic legends about Parasurama, Rama, Krishna and others. According to Alf Hiltebeitel – an Indian Religions and Sanskrit Epics scholar, the Akanaṉūṟu has the earliest known mentions of some stories such as "Krishna stealing sarees of Gopis" which is found later in north Indian literature, making it probable that some of the ideas from Tamil Hindu scholars inspired the Sanskrit scholars in the north and the Bhagavata Purana, rather than vice versa.

According to Kamil Zvelebil – a scholar of Tamil literature and history, a few poems in the Akananuru were probably composed sometime between 1st century BCE and 2nd century CE, the middle layer between 2nd and 4th century CE, while the last layers were completed sometime between 3rd and 5th century CE. Other names for Akananuru include Ahappattu, Ahananuru, and Agananuru.

Authors
As many as 145 poets are said to have contributed to Akananuru collection. Perunthevanaar, who translated the Mahabharatham into Tamil, is one of the authors. Rudrasarman compiled this anthology at the behest of the Pandya king Ukkiraperuvazhuthi.

Date
The Akananuru poems were likely composed later in the Sangam period than other akam poetry based on the linguistic evidence, the introduction of mathematical arrangement, and given the mention of overseas trade and north Indian dynasties. According to Takanobu Takahashi, the Akananuru poems were composed over several centuries, likely from 1st to 3rd century CE. Other scholars such as Vaiyapuri Pillai chronologically place the Akanaṉūṟu after the Narrinai and Kuṟuntokai anthologies. According to Kamil Zvelebil, except for a few Akananuru poems such as 10, 35, 140 which were probably completed between 1st century BCE and 2nd century CE, while few poems are believed to be composed around the late 2nd century BCE based on the mentions of the Maurya and the Nanda empire. Most of the Akananuru was likely composed sometime between the 2nd and 5th century CE.

Poetic characteristics
Aganaṉūṟu book comes under the Agam category in its subject matter. The poems of this anthology are of the Akaval meter. Akananuru contains 401 stanzas and is divided into three sections
 Kalintruyanainirai (களிற்றுயானைநிறை), 121 stanzas
 Manimidaipavalam (மணிமிடைபவளம்), 180 stanzas
 Nittilakkovai (நித்திலக்கோவை), 100 stanzas

English Translations
Bharathidasan University has published a full translation of all the 400 songs by A. Dakshinamurthy in 3 volumes in 1999:

Ramayana Reference

Akanaṉūṟu has a reference to the Ramayana in poem 70. The poem places a triumphant Rama at Dhanushkodi, sitting under a Banyan tree, involved in some secret discussions, when the birds are chirping away. This seems to indicate that the story of the Ramayana was familiar in the Tamil lands before the Kamba Ramayanam of the 12th century.

See also
 Eight Anthologies
 Eighteen Greater Texts
 Sangam literature

References

Bibliography

 Mudaliyar, Singaravelu A., Apithana Cintamani, An encyclopaedia of Tamil Literature, (1931) - Reprinted by Asian Educational Services, New Delhi (1983)
 
 
 Selby, Martha Ann (2011) Tamil Love Poetry: The Five Hundred Short Poems of the Aiṅkuṟunūṟu, an Early Third-Century Anthology. Columbia University Press, 

 
 

Sangam literature
Ancient Indian poems